Changwon LG Sakers are a basketball team located in the city of Changwon in South Gyeongsang Province, South Korea. They play in the Korean Basketball League, and their home arena is Changwon Gymnasium which has a capacity for approximately 6,000 people. The team's main sponsor is LG Electronics which has its offices in Changwon.

The professional team was established in 1997 and was named Gyeongnam LG Sakers. The name was changed to the Changwon LG Sakers after the first season.

LG Sakers has yet to win a KBL championship. The closest they came was in the 2000–01 season, when they finished as runners-up, losing to Suwon Samsung Thunders in the finals.

Current roster

Enlisted players

Season by season

Honours

Domestic

Korean Basketball League
KBL Championship
 Runners-up: 2000–01, 2013–14 

KBL Regular Season
 Winners: 2013–14
  Runners-up: 1997–98, 2000–01, 2002–03, 2006–07
 Third place: 2018–19

Cup
KBL Pro-Am
 Runners-up: 2016

Continental
ABA Club Championship
 Winners: 2012, 2013

References

External links

 Official website

 
Sports teams in South Gyeongsang Province
Sport in Changwon
Basketball teams established in 1994
LG Sports
Basketball teams in South Korea
Korean Basketball League teams
1994 establishments in South Korea